Cartographers Range is a rugged mountain range about  long in the Victory Mountains, Victoria Land in Antarctica. It is bounded on the north by Pearl Harbor Glacier, on the east by Tucker Glacier, and on the south by Hearfield and Trafalgar Glaciers.

Mapped by United States Geological Survey (USGS) from surveys and U.S. Navy air photos, 1960–64. Named by Advisory Committee on Antarctic Names (US-ACAN) for the cartographers and cartographic technicians of the Branch of Special Maps, USGS.

References

Mountain ranges of Victoria Land
Borchgrevink Coast